Eric Brandon (18 July 1920 in East Ham, Essex – 8 August 1982 in Gosport, Hampshire) was a motor racing driver and businessman. He was closely associated with the Cooper Car Company, and was instrumental in the early development of the company.

When he and his boyhood friend John Cooper were released from military service after World War II they built two cars to the new National  regulations. Brandon, whose family business was electrical goods, had access to BTH magnetos for the JAP engines, which Cooper's father Charlie then acquired. Brandon entered his Cooper in numerous hillclimbs and sprints and in 1947, at Gransden Lodge airfield, he won Britain's first-ever 500 cc circuit race. He also won the first Formula Three title, in 1951.

Later in the 1950s Brandon entered five World Championship Grands Prix in larger, Formula Two Cooper-Bristols, but failed to score any Championship points. For much of his career Brandon raced for the Ecurie Richmond team, which he formed with Alan Brown. In 1955 he funded the construction of his own Halseylec sports car, named after his electrical supplies company. He continued to compete in cars until 1956, but had become increasingly involved in hydroplane racing and by 1957 had devoted himself entirely to this outlet for his competitive spirit.

Complete Formula One World Championship results
(key)

References

1920 births
1982 deaths
English Formula One drivers
British motorboat racers
English racing drivers
British Formula Three Championship drivers
People from East Ham
Sportspeople from Essex